Ardices is a genus of tiger moths in the family Erebidae. The genus was erected by Francis Walker in 1855 and the moths are found in Australia.

Species
 Ardices canescens Butler, 1875
 Ardices glatignyi (Le Guillou, 1841)

Subgenus Australemyra Dubatolov, 2005
 Ardices curvata (Donovan, 1805)

References

 , 2005: On the status of the Australian genus Ardices F. Walker, 1855 with the description of a new subgenus for A. curvata Donovan, 1805 (Lepidoptera, Arctiidae). Atalanta 36 (1/2): 173–179, 394-395 (colour plate 10).

Spilosomina
Moth genera